Khumsiyah is a village in Jizan Province, in south-western Saudi Arabia.

References

Populated places in Jizan Province